Kevin Alan Patullo (born July 14, 1981) is an American football coach who is the pass game coordinator for the Philadelphia Eagles of the National Football League (NFL). He previously served as an assistant coach for the Indianapolis Colts, New York Jets, Tennessee Titans, Buffalo Bills and Kansas City Chiefs.

Early life and playing career 
A native of Hillsborough Township, New Jersey, Patullo attended Western High School in Weston, Florida. As the school's starting quarterback, he broke his leg in the first game of his senior year. He attended and played college football at the University of South Florida, where he split time at both quarterback and wide receiver.

Coaching career

Early career
Following his playing career, Patullo spent time at his alma mater South Florida and Arizona as a graduate assistant. He also had stints with the Kansas City Chiefs and Buffalo Bills as an offensive assistant and quality control coach before joining the Tennessee Titans in 2014 as an assistant wide receivers coach.

New York Jets
Patullo was hired to be the quarterbacks coach for the New York Jets for the 2015 season. Considered an unusual hire due to his lack of coaching experience at the time, he was hired as he had previous experience with both Jets offensive coordinator Chan Gailey and starting quarterback Ryan Fitzpatrick from his time in Buffalo. He was fired alongside five other assistant coaches on January 3, 2017.

Texas A&M
After his termination from the Jets, Patullo joined the staff at Texas A&M as a senior offensive analyst.

Indianapolis Colts
Patullo was hired as the wide receivers coach for the Indianapolis Colts in 2018. He was to reassigned to pass game specialist before the 2020 season following the hire of Mike Groh.

Philadelphia Eagles
On January 24, 2021, Patullo was hired by the Philadelphia Eagles as their passing game coordinator under head coach Nick Sirianni.

References

External links 
 Indianapolis Colts bio
 Arizona Wildcats bio

1981 births
Living people
Sportspeople from Hillsborough Township, New Jersey
People from Weston, Florida
Players of American football from New Jersey
Players of American football from Florida
American football quarterbacks
South Florida Bulls football players
American football wide receivers
University of South Florida alumni
South Florida Bulls football coaches
Arizona Wildcats football coaches
Kansas City Chiefs coaches
Buffalo Bills coaches
Tennessee Titans coaches
New York Jets coaches
Texas A&M Aggies football coaches
Indianapolis Colts coaches
Philadelphia Eagles coaches
Sportspeople from Broward County, Florida